Nick McKenzie is an Australian investigative journalist. He has won 14 Walkley Awards, been twice named the Graham Perkin Australian Journalist of the Year and also received the Kennedy Award for Journalist of the Year in 2020 and 2022. He is the president of the Melbourne Press Club.

McKenzie is known for his work exposing corruption in politics, business, foreign affairs/defence, human rights issues and policing/criminal justice. He works for Melbourne's The Age, The Sydney Morning Herald and The Australian Financial Review, and has reported for Australian Broadcasting Corporation's Four Corners and Nine’s 60 Minutes.

Life and career
McKenzie graduated from RMIT University, Melbourne with a Bachelor of Arts (Journalism) in 2001. He also holds a Masters in International Politics from the University of Melbourne and is currently obtaining a Melbourne JD (Juris Doctor), from Monash University.

He firstly worked as a cadet journalist at the Australian Broadcasting Corporation, later joining Fairfax Media (publisher of The Age and The Sydney Morning Herald). McKenzie's reporting has led to a number of government inquiries and police investigations, including a federal police probe into political donations given by alleged mafia figures.

In 2009, a report by McKenzie and colleague Richard Baker into foreign bribery involving Reserve Bank of Australia subsidiaries sparked a national scandal. It led to Australia's first-ever foreign bribery prosecution in 2011 and guilty pleas of RBA firms Securency and Note Printing Australia. McKenzie and Baker were awarded a Walkley Award for Investigative Reporting for their investigation, which also led to the governor of the Reserve Bank, Glenn Stevens, testifying before a Senate committee to respond to allegations the bank mishandled the scandal.

In 2012, McKenzie’s reporting on corruption and organised crime within the Australian Customs service was recognised with a Walkley Award. The reporting led to reforms of the Australian customs service announced in 2013 by Home Affairs Minister Jason Clare and overseen by former NSW judge James Wood. 
In 2012, McKenzie obtained confidential Victoria Police files documenting the suicides of at least 40 people sexually abused by Catholic clergy in Victoria. Victorian Premier Ted Baillieu immediately called a parliamentary inquiry into abuse allegations by religious clergy.

A 2012 interview McKenzie conducted with sports scientist Steven Dank was used by Australia’s anti-doping agency ASADA in its controversial doping case against the Essendon Football Club.

In 2014, a news story by McKenzie on Four Corners into abuse in disability care homes led to a Victorian Ombudsman inquiry and a federal senate inquiry, which recommended a royal commission that was later announced by the Morrison Government.

McKenzie has been involved in many high profile stories.  He interviewed Australian terrorist leader Abdul Nacer Benbrika before Benbrika was prosecuted for leading terror cells in Sydney and Melbourne. During Benbrika’s court case, the public prosecutor told the court that Benbrika was covertly recorded by authorities claiming that he had threatened McKenzie, telling him to “watch yourself” and that he knew how to find the reporter.

In 2014, a report co-authored by McKenzie on an undisclosed multi-million dollar payment to Hong Kong chief executive CY Leung from Australian company UGL, prompted widespread calls for Leung's resignation and sparked an investigation by Hong Kong authorities.

In 2016, McKenzie and Baker revealed the Unaoil oil industry corruption scandal that implicated some of the world's biggest oil industry firms, including Rolls-Royce, ABB, Petrofac and Halliburton in alleged corruption involving a Monaco firm called Unaoil. In 2019, the founders of Unaoil pleaded guilty to bribery and corruption offences in the United States.

McKenzie is Jewish

Documentaries 
McKenzie was awarded the Graham Perkin Australian Journalist of the Year Award and the Lowy Institute Media Award for reporting on foreign interference in Australia by the Chinese Communist Party.

His 2017 Four Corners documentary program Power and Influence reported that ASIO had warned Australian political parties about receiving donations from two men, billionaires Huang Xiangmo and Chau Chak Wing.  It also reported that former Trade Minister Andrew Robb had been hired on a $880,000 yearly consultancy by a company closely linked to the Chinese government.

The story was a catalyst for Australia's controversial counter foreign interference laws and later led to the resignation of senator Sam Dastyari over his dealings with Huang.  Huang was expelled from Australia by ASIO on security grounds, but denied the allegations about him, while Chau Chak Wing commenced defamation proceedings.

In July 2019, McKenzie presented Crown Unmasked detailing corporate misconduct involving Crown Resorts, including allegations Crown was working with casino junket operators owned by Hong Kong’s triads. The investigation also reported Australia’s Department of Home Affairs favoured visa applications by Crown’s VIP gamblers, including criminals. Crown attacked the reporting in advertisements, describing it as “a deceitful campaign.”  Crown's chairwoman Helen Coonan in 2020 told a commission of inquiry into Crown's suitability to hold a gaming licence that the advertisement contained significant errors. The Australian Criminal Intelligence Commission also opened probes into the money laundering allegations.

On 14 June 2020, McKenzie reporting for The Age and Nine Network 60 Minutes Australia released covert recordings purporting to show cabinet minister and Labor party power broker Adem Somyurek organising branch stacking. Somyurek is alleged to have registered local party members with false details, taking funds from business owners to pay for party membership fees, and directing ministerial staffers to engage in wrongdoing. Included in the numerous covert recordings, are several sections where Somyurek is heard making derogatory comments towards MPs Gabrielle Williams and Marlene Kairouz and ministerial staffers, which have been described as sexist and homophobic.

On 15 June 2020, Premier Dan Andrews sacked Somyurek from his cabinet and referred Somyurek's conduct to the Independent Broad-based Anti-corruption Commission for further investigation. Andrews also wrote to the National Executive of the Australian Labor Party (ALP) to seek the termination of Somyurek's party membership. Later that day, the Labor Party's national president, Wayne Swan, confirmed that Somyurek had resigned his membership and there would "never be a place for Somyurek in the ALP ever again".

Court cases and shield laws  
In 2010, McKenzie and investigative reporters Ben Schneiders and Royce Millar revealed political parties were storing personal information about voters, raising privacy concerns. A Greens party candidate had supplied the password to the ALP Eleczilla voter profile database, prompting the police to charged the trio with unauthorised access to a restricted database. The trio admitted responsibility for the database access as part of a court diversion program, avoiding a conviction. The trio’s barrister said there was a public interest in whether political parties should maintain such data and that investigative journalists provide “genuine service to this community.” The Age published a news article acknowledging the unlawful conduct, while editor-in-chief Andrew Holden defended the reporting, stating investigative journalists needed to report public interest stories.

In a 2013 source case brought by a political donor in the Supreme Court of New South Wales, three journalists including McKenzie made an application to keep their sources confidential, but could not rely on shield laws as they hadn’t been introduced. Justice Lucy McCallum ruled a journalist's pledge to keep a source confidential "is not a right or an end in itself" and could be overridden "in the interests of justice," but the case was settled and no sources disclosed.

In 2015, McKenzie defeated a Victorian Supreme Court application brought by an alleged mafia figure for disclosure of his sources in the first legal test of Victoria’s journalist shield laws. The case was described by the ABC's Media Watch program as a landmark test of source protection. The court ruled that identifying McKenzie’s sources would jeopardise their safety, that there was a strong public interest in reporting on the mafia's infiltration of politics and that there would be a chilling effect if disclosure was granted. The Australian journalists’ union, the MEAA, described the decision as “important for public interest journalism," but other reporting suggested shield laws still remained unsatisfactory. In his ruling, Supreme Court Justice John Dixon found that it was reasonable for police to suspect the alleged mafia figure placed a $200,000 “hit” on the suspected newspaper source.

In 2016, the alleged mafia boss abandoned his defamation legal action against The Age over a series of articles describing him as a mafia boss involved in murder, extortion and drug trafficking. The Age published an apology noting the man was never charged by the police, but did not retract reports identifying him as the head of the Calabrian mafia.
 
In 2017, the ABC reached a confidential settlement with the Chinese Students and Scholars Association president after she appeared in a Four Corners program reported by McKenzie about the influence of the Chinese Communist Party in Australian politics and universities.  The president demanded an apology but this was refused and instead Four Corners added an editors note to the program transcript.”

In 2017, McKenzie and veteran reporter Chris Masters produced several reports detailing allegations that Australia’s special forces committed war crimes in Afghanistan. They reported that Victoria Cross recipient Ben Roberts-Smith is under investigation by the federal police and the military inspector general. Roberts-Smith attacked the claims as unfounded and is suing McKenzie and Masters for defamation. The trial is due to commence in June 2021 in Sydney.

Awards and recognition
McKenzie has won Australia's top journalism award, the Walkley Award, ten times.

In 2010, McKenzie and colleague Richard Baker won the Australian Centre for Independent Journalism's George Munster prize.

In 2012, McKenzie and Baker were rated the third most influential journalists or editors in Australia by news website Crikey.

McKenzie has twice been named the Graham Perkin Australian Journalist of the Year, once alongside Baker (2017) and by himself in 2021. In 2019, McKenzie won the Lowy Institute Media Award for reporting on foreign interference in Australia.

In 2020, McKenzie was named the Kennedy Award's Journalist of the Year for his work exposing war crimes and corporate corruption. He won the award again in 2022.

McKenzie is the most decorated journalist in the history of the Melbourne Press Club's Quill Awards and has twice won the press club's highest award, the Gold Quill.

Walkley Awards
The annual Walkley Awards, under the administration of the Walkley Foundation for Journalism, are presented in Australia to recognise and reward excellence in journalism. McKenzie's ten Walkley Awards include:

 2004 Walkley for exposing police corruption
 2008 Walkley for exposing organising crime and race fixing in Australian racing
 2011 Walkley for exposing corporate misconduct and bribery linked to Reserve Bank
 2013 Walkley for doping in the Australian Football League
 2013 Walkley for exposing corruption inside Australia’s border force agency
 2014 Walkley for exposing corruption in construction industry and union movement
 2019 Walkley for exposing organised crime and foreign interference linked to Australia’s biggest gaming company Crown Resorts
 2020 Walkley for exposing misconduct and the dark underbelly of Australian power in the 60 Minutes investigation "The Faceless Man"

Works
In 2012, McKenzie's book The Sting, about one of Australia's biggest organised crime and money laundering investigations, was published by Melbourne University Publishing (MUP) Victory Books.

McKenzie has also contributed to the Australian journalism textbooks, Australian Journalism Today (2012) and The Best Australian Business Writing (2012).

References

External links
 nickmckenzie.com.au Official website
 Nick McKenzie AU at youtube

Living people
Year of birth missing (living people)
Australian investigative journalists
21st-century Australian journalists